Nếnh  is a township (Thị trấn) and town in Việt Yên District, Bắc Giang Province, in north-eastern Vietnam.

References

Populated places in Bắc Giang province
Communes of Bắc Giang province
Townships in Vietnam